Psycho is a 1998 American psychological horror film produced and directed by Gus Van Sant, and starring Vince Vaughn, Julianne Moore, Viggo Mortensen, William H. Macy, and Anne Heche. It is a modern remake of Alfred Hitchcock's 1960 film of the same name, in which an embezzler arrives at an old motel run by a mysterious man named Norman Bates; both films are adapted from Robert Bloch's 1959 novel.

Though filmed in color and set in 1998, the film is closer to a shot-for-shot retelling than most remakes, often copying Hitchcock's camera movements and editing, including the original script by Joseph Stefano (and uncredited writer Alma Reville) mostly being carried over. Bernard Herrmann's musical score is reused as well, though with a new arrangement by Danny Elfman and Steve Bartek, recorded in stereo. Some changes are introduced to account for advances in technology since the original film and to make the content more explicit. The film's murder sequences are also intercut with surreal images.

Psycho was a commercial failure and earned mixed reviews from critics who criticized the similarities to the original film, though Heche's acting received some praise. It won the Golden Raspberry Awards for Worst Remake and Worst Director, and was nominated for Worst Actress (Heche). However, it earned two Saturn Award nominations for Best Actress (Heche) and Best Writing (Stefano).

Plot
During a Friday afternoon tryst in a Phoenix hotel, real-estate secretary Marion Crane and her boyfriend Sam Loomis discuss their inability to get married because of his debts and alimony demands from his previous marriage to his ex-wife. Returning to work, she decides to steal a cash payment of $400,000 entrusted to her for deposit at the bank and drive to Sam's home in Fairvale, California, where he owns a hardware store. En route, she hurriedly trades her car, making both the car dealer and a California Highway Patrol trooper suspicious.

Running into bad weather, Marion stops for the night at the Bates Motel, located off the main highway. Proprietor Norman Bates descends from a large house atop a hill overlooking the motel, registers Marion under an assumed name she uses, and invites her to dine with him. After he returns to his house, Marion overhears him arguing with his mother Norma about her presence. Upon returning with a light meal and apologizing for his mother's outbursts, Norman discusses his taxidermy hobby, his mother's "illness" and how people have their own "private trap" that they wish to escape from. Returning to her room, Marion, remorseful of her crime, decides to drive back to Phoenix in the morning and return the stolen money hidden in a newspaper, unaware that the aroused Norman is watching her through a hole in the wall. As Marion showers, a shadowy figure appears, brutally stabs her to death and leaves. Anguished and horrified upon finding Marion's corpse, Norman cleans up the murder scene, wraps the body in the shower curtain and places it along with her belongings and the hidden cash in her car, and sinks the car in a swamp near the motel.

Marion's sister Lila arrives in Fairvale a week later, tells Sam about the theft, and probes her whereabouts, but he denies her disappearance. Private investigator Milton Arbogast approaches them, saying that he has been hired to retrieve the money. Learning that Marion spent a night at the Bates Motel, he questions Norman, whose nervousness and inconsistency arouse Arbogast's suspicion. When Norman implies Marion had spoken to his mother, Arbogast asks to speak to her, but Norman refuses. Arbogast, not yet suspecting the worst, updates Sam and Lila about his findings, and promises to phone again later. When he enters the Bates home looking for Norman's mother, a figure resembling an elderly woman emerges from the bedroom and fatally stabs him.

Hearing no word from Arbogast, Sam and Lila grow curious about the Bates Motel, Arbogast's last stop. The pair later visit Al Chambers, the local sheriff, who tells them that Norman's mother died in a murder-suicide ten years earlier, concluding that Arbogast lied to Sam and Lila so he could pursue Marion and the money. Convinced that something happened to Arbogast, Lila and Sam drive to the motel, check in while posing as a married couple, and infiltrate Marion's room, finding a missing shower curtain and a scrap of paper indicating that Marion subtracted an amount from her cash payment. Sam distracts Norman in the office, while Lila sneaks into the house. Suspicious, Norman becomes agitated and knocks Sam unconscious. As he runs to the house, Lila hides in the fruit cellar, where she discovers the mother's mummified body. She screams, and Norman, wearing his mother's clothes and a wig, enters the cellar and tries to stab her. Sam appears and subdues him, rescuing Lila.

At the police station, psychiatrist Dr. Simon Richmond explains that Norman jealously murdered Norma and her lover by poisoning them with strychnine ten years earlier. He mummified her corpse and began treating it as if she were still alive, even going so far as to recreate her in his mind as an alternate personality, as jealous and possessive as she was while alive. When Norman is attracted to a woman, "Mother" takes over: he had murdered two other young women before Marion, and Arbogast was killed to hide "his mother's" crime. Dr. Richmond concludes "Mother" has now completely taken over Norman's personality. Sitting in a jail cell, Norman hears his mother saying that the murders were all his doing, as Marion's car is retrieved from the swamp.

Cast

Production

Development
Director Gus Van Sant was a longtime admirer of Alfred Hitchcock's Psycho (1960), and, while a film student, shot a parody commercial for a fictional "Psycho Shampoo" brand, which featured a recreation of the 1960 film's shower murder sequence. After the release of Van Sant's financially successful Good Will Hunting (1997), Universal Pictures agreed to option his proposed remake of the film. Van Sant's pitch was to remake the film shot-for-shot, which Casey Silver, then-head of production at Universal Pictures, felt was "a very strange idea. The idea of remaking a classic like Psycho just seemed like a dangerous business to get into". When asked why he wanted to remake the film in this manner, Van Sant responded: "Why not? It's a marketing scheme. Why does a studio ever remake a film? Because they have this little thing they've forgotten about that they could put in the marketplace and make money from".

Casting
Marion Crane was initially slated to be played by Nicole Kidman, but she was forced to leave the role due to scheduling problems. Drew Barrymore was also considered for the role before Anne Heche was ultimately cast.

Julianne Moore, who was cast as Lila Crane, intentionally chose to portray the character as a more aggressive personality in contrast to Vera Miles's interpretation.

William H. Macy chose to stay true to the portrayal of his character in the 1960 film, while Vince Vaughn and Julianne Moore interpreted the dialogue and scenes from the original film differently.

Filming

Filming of Psycho took place largely on the Universal Studios Hollywood backlot in Los Angeles, with additional exterior filming taking place in Phoenix, including at the Hotel Westward Ho.

Van Sant began with the vision of remaking the film entirely shot-for-shot, stating that he and his crew started out being fanatical about doing it exactly the same, but early into the filming process, realized that doing so was unfeasible: "There were a couple of scenes we just couldn't get it right. We just couldn't see how Hitchcock did the blocking, where people were supposed to be standing in relation to the camera. So all we could do was loosely base them on the original".

Because the film was shot in color, fake blood was used during the film's infamous shower murder scene, instead of chocolate syrup as had been done in the original film. Rick Baker designed the Mrs. Bates dummy. The new film heightened the violence to the levels of depictions of violence in films made circa 1998 by portraying two knife wounds in her back and blood on the wall in the shower scene. It also shows the buttocks of the Marion character when she dies, an aspect cut from the original film.

The costume designer, Beatrix Aruna Pasztor, originally thought that the film was going to be a period piece, so she acquired period clothing for the cast, which was used in the film.

Diversions from 1960 film
Though almost entirely a shot-for-shot remake of the original, the film does feature slight differences in terms of visuals, minor plot details, as well as the actors' portrayals of the characters. Van Sant updated several elements in the screenplay, including setting the film in contemporary 1998, and adjusting the references to money that would be anachronistic in a modern-day setting. Due to inflation, the amount of money stolen as stipulated in the original film was adjusted from $40,000 to $400,000.

Where the 1960 film features little visual bloodletting in its murder sequences, Van Sant's film features more explicit violence, particularly during Marion Crane's murder sequence in the shower: in Van Sant's film, blood is shown streaming down the shower wall tiles, as well as visible stab wounds to Crane's back as she collapses in the bathtub.

During the scene where Norman Bates spies on Marion through a peephole as she undresses, it is made explicit that Bates is masturbating through the use of sound effects as well as Vaughn's performance, which suggests Bates's voyeuristic encounter ends in him having an orgasm; in the 1960 film, the sequence consists merely of Bates observing, with no suggestion that he is masturbating.

Van Sant also employed several surreal subliminal images that were edited into the film's murder sequences, likened by horror writer Charles Derry as "surreal memory fragments" that "flash" before the characters' eyes as they die.

Release

Box office
Psycho was released theatrically in the United States on December 4, 1998 in 2,477 theaters, ranking at number two at the domestic box office with a weekend gross of $10,031,850. It went on to earn a total of $37,141,130 in the worldwide box office, $21,456,130 domestically. The film's production budget was an estimated $60 million; while promoting his 2002 film Gerry, Van Sant said he thought the producers "broke even" financially.

Critical reception
On Rotten Tomatoes, Psycho holds an approval rating of 40% based on 78 reviews, with an average rating of 5.30/10. The website's critics consensus reads: "Van Sant's pointless remake neither improves nor illuminates Hitchcock's original". At Metacritic the film has a weighted average score of 47 out of 100, based on 23 critics, indicating "mixed or average reviews". Audiences polled by CinemaScore gave the film an average grade of "C−" on an A+ to F scale.

Literary critic Camille Paglia commented that the only reason to watch it was "to see Anne Heche being assassinated" and that "it should have been a much more important work and event than it was". At the 1998 Stinkers Bad Movie Awards, the film was cited as one of 37 dishonourable mentions for Worst Picture. Universal Pictures received the Founders Award "for even thinking the moviegoing public would line up and pay to see a shot-for-shot remake of Psycho".

Film critic Roger Ebert, who gave the film one-and-a-half stars, noted that the addition of a masturbation scene was "appropriate, because this new Psycho evokes the real thing in an attempt to re-create remembered passion". He thought Vaughn was miscast, unable to capture the "secret pool of madness" in the Norman Bates as a character, and Heche was guilty of overacting. Ebert wrote that the film "is an invaluable experiment in the theory of cinema, because it demonstrates that a shot-by-shot remake is pointless; genius apparently resides between or beneath the shots, or in chemistry that cannot be timed or counted".
Janet Maslin remarks that it is an "artful, good-looking remake (a modest term, but it beats plagiarism) that shrewdly revitalizes the aspects of the real Psycho (1960) that it follows most faithfully but seldom diverges seriously or successfully from one of the cinema's most brilliant blueprints"; she noted that the "absence of anything like Anthony Perkins's sensational performance with that vitally birdlike presence and sneaky way with a double-entendre ('A boy's best friend is his mother') is the new film's greatest weakness".

Eugene Novikov for Film Blather admired the film, saying that he enjoyed the remake more than the original film. Jonathan Romney of The Guardian also championed the film, writing: "Somehow, Van Sant has managed to spin a big-budget studio project into a piece of conceptual art, a provocative inquiry into the nature of cinematic originality. It's not the full-on 'queer Psycho''' that Van Sant fans predicted, but it is an extraordinary drag act".

Leonard Maltin's Movie Guide classified the film as a "bomb", compared to the four-out-of-four stars he gave the original. He describes it as a "slow, stilted, completely pointless scene-for-scene remake of the Hitchcock classic (with a few awkward new touches to taint its claim as an exact replica)". He ultimately calls it "an insult, rather than a tribute, to a landmark film...What promised to be Drugstore Cowboys answer to Hitchcock' is more like Hitchcock's answer to Even Cowgirls Get the Blues".

Accolades
At the 19th Golden Raspberry Awards, the film was awarded two Golden Raspberry Awards (or "Razzies"), for Worst Remake or Sequel and Worst Director for Gus Van Sant, while Anne Heche was nominated for Worst Actress, where she lost the trophy to the Spice Girls for Spice World. Contrastingly, at the 25th Saturn Awards the film was nominated for the Saturn Awards of Best Supporting Actress for Heche and Best Writing for Stefano.

Home media
Universal Pictures Home Entertainment released Psycho on VHS and in a collector's edition DVD on June 8, 1999. In June 2017, Scream Factory released the film on Blu-ray for the first time, which featured a new critical audio commentary, as well as the bonus materials included on Universal's 1999 DVD release.

Legacy
A number of critics and writers viewed Van Sant's version as an experiment in shot-for-shot remakes.

Screenwriter Joseph Stefano, who wrote the original script that was carried over to the remake, thought that although she spoke the same lines, Anne Heche portrays Marion Crane as an entirely different character.

Even Van Sant later admitted that it was an experiment that proved that no one can really copy a film exactly the same way as the original. One favorable take on the film came from an LA Weekly retrospective article published in 2013, in which writer Vern stated that the film was misunderstood as a commercially motivated film when it was in fact an "experiment" and this was the reason for the poor reception. Vern concluded that "experiments don't always have to work to be worth doing".

Although the film's overall reception was less-than-favorable, it did receive a blessing from Hitchcock's daughter Pat, who stated that her father would have been flattered by the remake of his original work.

"Psychos"
On February 24, 2014, a mashup of Alfred Hitchcock and Van Sant's versions of Psycho appeared on Steven Soderbergh's Extension 765 website. Retitled Psychos and featuring no explanatory text, the recut appears to be a fan edit of the two films by Soderbergh. The opening credits intermingle names from both the 1960 and 1998 versions, and all color has been removed from Van Sant's scenes with the exception of the infamous shower scene.

Soundtrack

The film's soundtrack, Psycho: Music from and Inspired by the Motion Picture'', included Danny Elfman's re-recordings of some of Bernard Herrmann's score for the original film, along with a collection of songs in genres from country to drum and bass, connected mainly by titles containing "psycho" or other death or insanity-related words. Many of the songs were recorded specifically for the soundtrack, and included a sampling of Bernard Herrmann's score composed by Danny Elfman. The soundtrack also includes the track "Living Dead Girl" by Rob Zombie, which can be heard during the film when Marion trades in her old car for a new one.

Note

References

Sources

External links

 
 
 
 

1998 films
1998 horror films
1990s horror thriller films
1998 LGBT-related films
1990s mystery films

1990s psychological thriller films
1990s serial killer films
Remakes of American films
American horror thriller films
American LGBT-related films
American mystery horror films
American psychological horror films
American psychological thriller films
Films about dissociative identity disorder
1990s English-language films
Films produced by Brian Grazer
Films directed by Gus Van Sant
Films with screenplays by Joseph Stefano
Films scored by Danny Elfman
Films scored by Bernard Herrmann
American films based on actual events
Films based on adaptations
Films based on American horror novels
Films based on multiple works
Films based on thriller novels
Films set in 1998
Films set in California
Films set in Phoenix, Arizona
Films set in Maricopa County, Arizona
Films shot in California
Films shot in Los Angeles
Golden Raspberry Award winning films
LGBT-related horror thriller films
Horror film remakes
Matricide in fiction
LGBT-related horror films
Psycho (franchise) films
Imagine Entertainment films
Universal Pictures films
Films based on works by Robert Bloch
Cross-dressing in American films
Shot-for-shot remakes
1990s American films